A constitutional referendum was held in the Republic of the Congo on 15 March 1992. The new constitution created a presidential republic with a bicameral parliament and a division of powers between the two. It was approved by 96% of voters with a 70.9% turnout.

Results

References

1992 referendums
Referendums in the Republic of the Congo
1992 in the Republic of the Congo
Constitutional referendums in the Republic of the Congo